Business with Friends was a 1992 British television drama, directed by Uwe Janson and written by David Spencer. Its cast included Adie Allen and Christopher Eccleston.

External links

1992 television films
1992 films
British television films
ScreenPlay
Films directed by Uwe Janson